ClickHouse is an open-source column-oriented DBMS (columnar database management system) for online analytical processing (OLAP) that allows users to generate analytical reports using SQL queries in real-time. ClickHouse Inc. is headquartered in the Bay Area of California, United States with the subsidiary, ClickHouse B.V., based in Amsterdam, Netherlands.  

In September of 2021 in San Francisco, CA, ClickHouse incorporated to house the open source technology with an initial $50 million investment from Index Ventures and Benchmark Capital with participation by Yandex N.V. and others. On October 28, 2021 the company received Series B funding totaling $250 million at an valuation of $2 billion from Coatue Management, Altimeter Capital, and other investors. The company continues to build the open source project and engineering cloud technology.

History 
ClickHouse’s technology was first developed over 10 years ago at Yandex, Russia's largest technology company. In 2009, Alexey Milovidov and developers started an experimental project to check the hypothesis if it was viable to generate analytical reports in real-time from non-aggregated data that is also constantly added in real-time. The developers spent 3 years to prove this hypothesis, and in 2012 ClickHouse launched in production for the first time to power Yandex.Metrica, the second-largest web analytics platform in the world, after Google Analytics. 

Unlike custom data structures used before, ClickHouse was applicable more generally to work as a database management system. The power and utility of ClickHouse offered a true column-oriented DBMS, it allowed for systems to generate reports from petabytes of raw data with sub-second latencies. ClickHouse was widely adopted at Yandex including for Yandex.Tank load testing tool and Yandex.Market to monitor site accessibility and KPIs.

In 2016, the ClickHouse project was released as open-source software under the Apache 2 license in June 2016 to power analytical use cases around the globe. The systems at the time offered a server throughput of a hundred thousand rows per second, ClickHouse out performed that speed with a throughput of hundreds of millions of rows per second. 

Since ClickHouse became available as open source in 2016, its popularity has grown exponentially, as evidenced through adoption by industry-leading companies like Uber, Comcast, eBay, and Cisco. ClickHouse was also implemented at CERN's LHCb experiment to store and process metadata on 10 billion events with over 1000 attributes per event.

Features 

The main features of the ClickHouse DBMS are:
 True column-oriented DBMS. Nothing is stored with the values. For example, constant-length values are supported to avoid storing their length "number" next to the values.
 Linear scalability. It's possible to extend a cluster by adding servers.
 Fault tolerance. The system is a cluster of shards, where each shard is a group of replicas. ClickHouse uses asynchronous multi-master replication. Data is written to any available replica, then distributed to all the remaining replicas. ZooKeeper is used for coordinating processes, but it's not involved in query processing and execution.
 Capability to store and process petabytes of data.
 SQL support. ClickHouse supports an extended SQL-like language that includes arrays and nested data structures, approximate and URI functions, and the availability to connect an external key-value store.
 High performance.
 Vector calculations are used. Data is not only stored by columns, but is processed by vectors (parts of columns). This approach allows it to achieve high CPU performance.
 Sampling and approximate calculations are supported.
 Parallel and distributed query processing is available (including JOINs).
 Data compression.
 Hard disk drive (HDD) optimization. The system can process data that doesn't fit in random-access memory (RAM).
 Clients for database (DB) connectivity. Database connection options include the console client, the HTTP API, or one of the wrappers (wrappers are available for Python, PHP, NodeJS,  Perl, Ruby and R). ODBC driver and JDBC driver are also available for ClickHouse.

Limitations 
ClickHouse has some features that can be considered disadvantages:
 There is no support for transactions.
 Lack of full-fledged UPDATE/DELETE implementation.

Use cases 
ClickHouse was designed for OLAP queries.
 It works with a small number of tables that contain a large number of columns.
 Queries can use a large number of rows extracted from the DB, but only a small subset of columns.
 Queries are relatively rare (usually around 100 RPS per server).
 For simple queries, latencies of about 50 ms are allowed.
 Column values are fairly small, usually consisting of numbers and short strings (for example, 60 bytes per URL).
 High throughput is required when processing a single query (up to billions of rows per second per server).
 A query result is mostly filtered or aggregated.
 Data update uses a simple scenario (usually batch-only, without complicated transactions).
One of the common cases for ClickHouse is server log analysis. After setting regular data uploads to ClickHouse (it's recommended to insert data in fairly large batches with more than 1000 rows), it's possible to analyze incidents with instant queries or monitor a service's metrics, such as error rates, response times, and so on.

ClickHouse can also be used as an internal data warehouse for in-house analysts. ClickHouse can store data from different systems (such as Hadoop or certain logs) and analysts can build internal dashboards with the data or perform real-time analysis for business purposes.

Benchmark results 
According to benchmark tests conducted by its developers, for OLAP queries ClickHouse is more than 100 times faster than Hive (a DBMS based on the Hadoop technology stack) or MySQL (a common RDBMS).

See also 
 List of column-oriented DBMSes

References

External links 
 ClickHouse official website

C++ software
Free software
Free database management systems
Online analytical processing
Structured storage
Data warehousing
Data warehousing products
Data analysis software
Distributed data stores